is a stratovolcano located in Inawashiro-town, Bandai-town, and Kitashiobara village, in Yama-Gun, Fukushima prefecture. It is an active stratovolcano located to the north of Lake Inawashiro. Mount Bandai, including the Bandai heights, belongs to the Bandai-Asahi National Park.

The altitude of the triangulation station “Bandai”, installed in 1904, had been employed as the official altitude of Mount Bandai. However, after the station disappeared due to erosion, it was re-measured in October 2010 and now is 1,816.29m. The name “Mount Bandai” is used to refer to the main peak “Bandai”, along with several other peaks including Akahani at 1,430m and Kushigamine at 1,636m, created during the 1888 eruption of Mount Bandai.

Mount Bandai was originally called “Iwahashi-yama” which means “a rock ladder to the sky”. It is now sometimes called “Aizu Fuji” and “Aizu Bandai”.  The south foot is called Omotebandai and the north foot is called Urabandai. When seen from Omotebandai, the mountain looks very tidy, but when viewed from Urabandai the mountain shows a wild shape, due to its collapse.

It is one of the list of the 100 famous mountains in Japan. In 2007, the mountain was selected as one of the top 100 geographic landmarks in Japan. Additionally, in 2011 the mountain was certified as a geopark of Japan.

Volcanic activity 
Typical features of mount Bandai's activity are debris avalanches and sector collapses. We know this because evidence of this has been left in past activities. 
Mount Bandai has not experienced a lava flow after the eruption of about 10,000 years ago.
Sediment surveys have shown us that the history of the volcano can be divided into 6 sections.
It is thought that the volcanic activity period was from about 290,000 years ago when there were 2 scoria eruptions, after the activity of Mount Nekoma (from approximately 1.1 million years ago to 350 thousand years ago) somewhere to the west.

1. It is not clear when the volcanic activities of Mount Bandai started, but it is believed that before about 290,000 years ago it was inactive and only became active after the activities of Nekoma volcano, which lies to the west, from 1.1 million years ago to 350,000 years ago.

2. Approximately 290,000 years ago, there were two scoria eruptions.

3. From about 210,000 years to 200,000 years ago there were several scoria and pumice eruptions.
  
4. Approximately 165,000 to 145,000 years ago, there were eruptions of volcanic ash and pumice.

5. From about 80,000 years ago to 65,000 years ago, there were sub-plinian and Vulcanian eruptions of pumice, which broke up the shape of the mountain.

6. Approximately 40,000 to 50,000 years ago, there was continuous activity with pumice eruptions, and sector collapse.

Approximately 90,000 years ago at the time of the Okinajima pyroclastic flow, and 50,000 years ago at the time of the Zunashi pyroclastic flow, the river formally flowing through the Inawashiro basin was dammed, the water level went up, and Lake Inawashiro appeared.

Although it is said that the eruption which created four peaks in 1888 (Mount Obandai, Mount Kobandai, Mount Akabane, and Mount Amidagamine) was from a Mount Fuji shaped mountain of over 2000 meters formed in an eruption in 806 (the first year of Daido), there is also historic evidence which shows that there were eruptions at earlier times, which also changed the Mount Fuji shaped mountain.

Eruption of 1888  

On July 15, 1888 there was an explosion of water vapour in a Kobandai eruption. It is believed that hot ground water continuously spurting out had weathered the mountain and this caused it to collapse. This caused an avalanche of debris to bury 5 nearby villages on the north foot of the mountain and 477 people were killed.

This eruption was the first major disaster for the modern Japanese government which began from the Meiji period.

The government launched an enquiry to investigate the eruption and this was implemented by Kiyokage Sekiya and Yasu Kikuchi. The government provided relief and attempted to rebuild the affected villages. Extensive research, including surveys was undertaken into the causes of the eruption and the extent of the damage – this was an unusual measure to take at the time. Detailed pictures were taken of the events.

Donations amounting to ¥38,000 were gathered (which equates to around ¥1.5Bn presently) and these supported the relief and restoration effort. The Japanese Red Cross organization was involved in the relief effort after having been formed the previous year (1887) following an eruption and this was its first peacetime involvement in relief. A monument was erected in Goshikinuma to honour those who helped the relief effort.

The events of the eruption

In the week before the eruption there was rumbling but this was not recognized as a warning for the eruption. The earthquake began at around 7am on the day of the eruption and the eruption began at around 7:45. There were roughly 20 explosions following this. After the explosive eruption, the north side of Kobandai collapsed and sector collapses begun. The river Nagasegawa and its tributaries were blocked and lahars (volcanic mudslides) and debris flows damaged the downstream section of the river. Lake Hibara, Onogawako, Akimotoko and Goshikinuma were formed, all lakes of varied sizes. It was at this time the landscape of Urabandai was formed.

Sacred Mountains 

The Enichi Temple, located on the south-western foot of the Bandai Mountain, is surrounded by mountains where people come to worship; Mount Bandai (north east to the temple), Mount Mayadake (north to the temple), and Mount Azuma (north to Mount Bandai). The temple has served a central role in mountain worship because of its location. The Enichi Temple was founded in 807 A.D., one year after Mount Bandai erupted. Some people think that there is a connection between the eruption and the foundation of the Enichi Temple. Several routes for visiting Azumayama Shrine have been established, all originating from the main temple of the Enichi shrine.

Climbing routes 

There are 7 climbing routes of Mount Bandai, as follows.

 Happoudai mountain entrance route (八方台登山口): (Nekoma-happoudai→ Nakanoyuato → Ohanabatake observatory → Koubou-shimizu → mountain peak, duration: 2 hours, 3.5 km, range 620m) 
In August 2013, there was a defoliation outbreak caused by a species of moth, or beech caterpillar (Quadricalcarifera punctatella Motschulsky).

 Inawashiro mountain entrance route (猪苗代登山口): (Inawashiro Ski Centre → Tennoniwa → Mount Akahani → Numano-daira → Koubou Shimizu → mountain peak, duration: 3.5 hours, 5.5 km, range 1100m)
The Ski Resort route contains an additional 3 stops (West piste → Hayama Route → Rinkan Route)

 Okinajima Route (翁島登山口): (Inawashiro Ski Resort → mountain peak, duration: 3 hours, 3 km, range 1000m)
This route can be shortened by using the gondolas at the Inawashiro Ski Resort to 1 hour, but prior booking is required. There is no source of fresh water on the route.

 Urabandai mountain entrance A (裏磐梯登山口A) (Urabandai Ski Centre → Akanuma → Nakanoyu-ato → Koubou Shimizu → mountain peak duration: 3 hours 10 minutes, 6 km, range 900m) During the rainy season and early spring, the Akanuma area becomes waterlogged and due measures are required.
 Urabandai mountain entrance B (裏磐梯登山口B) (Urabandai Ski Centre → Kakougen → Kushigamine Col → Koubou Shimizu → mountain peak duration: 3 hours 20 minutes, 6 km, range 900m). The Kakougen route is hard to follow, and around the Kakouheki route, beware of falling rocks.
 Kawakami mountain entrance route (川上登山口) (Kawakami mountain entrance → Kakougen → Kushigamine Col → Koubou Shimizu → mountain peak, duration: 4 hours, 7 km, range: 1100m)
The Kawakami Spa mountain entrance is out of use, and the route is unclear before joining with that of the Urabandai course.

 Shibutani mountain entrance route (渋谷登山口) (Family Snow Park Bandai x2 mountain entrance → Biwasawa route → Numano-daira → Koubou Shimizu → mountain peak, duration: 3 hours 40 minutes, 7 km, range: 1200m). In the summer season, the route is unclear due to the proliferation of grass. Due to its lack of usage, it is referred to as the ‘Forest of Animals’.
Over 80% of summer climbers make use of the Happou mountain entrance route, which is located midway through the Bandai Golden Line (toll road). 
A source of potable water, the Kogane Shimizu, is located partway through the Inawashiro, Urabandai B, Kawakami, and Shibutani routes, and is located 45 minutes from the mountain peak at 1500m above sea level.
Another source of potable water, at the Koubou Shimizu, is passable by all routes except the Okinajima route. It is located 30 minutes from the peak, and its altitude is 1630m above sea level.
There are 2 shops at Koubou shimizu, which are open from early May to early October, and sell souvenirs, drinks and snacks, but are not accommodations. There are also restrooms, which are rented by the shopkeepers for ¥300. This stop is used also for checking routes and rest.

Due to the spillover effect, 1-seg signal for Yamagata-television and major four commercial broadcasting of Niigata prefecture can be received from the top of the mountain. The gentle slope along West Bantetsu line from near the Okina-jima station to Hirota station was formed by pyroclastic and non-pyroclastic flow of multiple eruptions over past years. The Goshiki-numa was created as a result of volcanic mud flow on Urabandai area from the 1888 eruption, and it carry away the large rock, called Mine-no-Ooishi, to its end of the north sector of the Iwashiro city.

See also 

100 Famous Japanese Mountains
List of volcanoes in Japan

Notes

References

External links
   – Japan Meteorological Agency
 Bandaisan – Smithsonian Institution: Global Volcanism Program
 Bandaisan Geopark 
 Climbing routes – Inawashiro Tourist Association

Mountains of Fukushima Prefecture
Volcanoes of Honshū
Stratovolcanoes of Japan
VEI-4 volcanoes
Subduction volcanoes
Iwashiro Province
19th-century volcanic events
Volcanoes of Fukushima Prefecture
Pleistocene stratovolcanoes
Holocene stratovolcanoes